Susannah Breslin is an American journalist and writer. She is the editor of Forbes' Vices section.

She has been a reporter for the Playboy TV program Sexcetera. Her blogging and television work deals with sexual and pornography-related topics. She has also written for periodicals including Playboy and appeared on Politically Incorrect as well as CNN and Fox News. Her published works include You're a Bad Man, Aren't You?, a book of short stories.

Her blog The Reverse Cowgirl was named by Time.com as one of the 25 best blogs in 2008.

References

External links
 
 

American women bloggers
American bloggers
American women short story writers
American relationships and sexuality writers
21st-century American women writers
Living people
Year of birth missing (living people)
21st-century American short story writers
American women non-fiction writers
21st-century American non-fiction writers